Funny Times is an album by Misty's Big Adventure, released in November 2007. It is their third full studio release and was preceded by the single "I Can't Get The Time Back" in October 2007.

Track listing
"Funny Times" - 3:33
"My Home No Longer Is My Home" - 3:30
"I Can't Bring The Time Back" - 3:16
"Home Made War" - 3:46
"Sitting On Your Doorstep" - 4:48
"Everything Goes Wrong" - 3:48
"How Did You Manage To Get Inside My Head?" - 4:02
"We Do! Do We? We Do!" - 3:15
"Keep Moving" - 3:24
"Serious Thing" - 4:36
"The Long Conveyor Belt" - 3:52

2007 albums
Misty's Big Adventure albums